Super Nova is the twelfth album by Wayne Shorter, recorded in 1969 and released on the Blue Note label. The album features five originals by Shorter and an arrangement of "Dindi"  by Antônio Carlos Jobim. "Water Babies", "Capricorn" and "Sweet Pea" were originally recorded in 1967 during sessions with Miles Davis that would eventually be released in 1976 as the album Water Babies.

Keyboardist Chick Corea appears on drums rather than his typical role, and bassist Walter Booker plays acoustic guitar on “Dindi”.

Reception
The Allmusic review by Scott Yanow awarded the album 4 stars, stating: "The influence of Miles Davis' early fusion period is felt throughout the music but there is nothing derivative about the often-surprising results. As with Wayne Shorter's best albums, this set rewards repeated listenings.".

Track listing
All compositions by Wayne Shorter except where noted.

 "Supernova" – 4:52
 "Swee-Pea" – 4:36
 "Dindi" (Antônio Carlos Jobim) – 9:35
 "Water Babies" – 4:53
 "Capricorn" – 7:47
 "More Than Human" – 6:12

Note
Recorded August 29 (1, 2, 4 & 5) and September 2 (3 & 6), 1969.

Personnel
Wayne Shorter – soprano saxophone
John McLaughlin – acoustic and electric guitar (1, 2, 4, 5)
Sonny Sharrock – electric guitar
Chick Corea – drums, vibes
Miroslav Vitouš – bass
Jack DeJohnette – drums, kalimba
Airto Moreira – percussion
Walter Booker – acoustic guitar (“Dindi”)
 Maria Booker – vocals (“Dindi”)
Niels Jakobsen – claves

References

1969 albums
Blue Note Records albums
Wayne Shorter albums
Albums produced by Alfred Lion